Dime Bank Building, also known as the Dime Bank & Trust Company Building, is a historic commercial building located at Scranton, Lackawanna County, Pennsylvania. It is a five-story brick building in the Richardsonian Romanesque style. The original three-story building was built in 1890-1891, and measured . In 1908, the building was again expanded with a concrete and slab fireproof wing. The facade features a delicately ornamented bay window, five-story turret, and three-story rectangular projection terminated at the third floor by a large arched masonry opening.

It was added to the National Register of Historic Places in 1978.  It is located in the Lackawanna Avenue Commercial Historic District.

References

Commercial buildings on the National Register of Historic Places in Pennsylvania
Romanesque Revival architecture in Pennsylvania
Commercial buildings completed in 1891
Commercial buildings completed in 1908
Buildings and structures in Scranton, Pennsylvania
National Register of Historic Places in Lackawanna County, Pennsylvania
1908 establishments in Pennsylvania